The 2016–17 Monmouth Hawks men's basketball team represented Monmouth University during the 2016–17 NCAA Division I men's basketball season. The Hawks, led by sixth year head coach King Rice, played their home games at OceanFirst Bank Center as members of the Metro Atlantic Athletic Conference (MAAC). They finished the season 27–7, 18–2 in MAAC play to win the regular season championship, their second consecutive conference title. As the No. 1 seed in the MAAC tournament, they defeated Niagara before losing to Siena in the semifinals. As a regular season conference champions who did not win their conference tournament, Monmouth received an automatic bid the National Invitation Tournament. As a No. 4 seed, they lost to Ole Miss in the first round.

Previous season 
The Hawks finished the 2016–17 season 28–8, 17–3 in MAAC play to win the MAAC regular season championship. They defeated Rider and Fairfield to advance to the championship game of the MAAC tournament where they lost to Iona. As a regular season conference champion who failed to win their conference tournament, they received an automatic bid to the National Invitation Tournament. As one of the last four teams left out of the NCAA tournament, they received a No. 1 seed in the NIT where they defeated Bucknell in the first round before losing to George Washington in the second round.

Roster

Schedule and results

|-
! colspan="9" style=| Regular season

|-
! colspan="9" style=| MAAC tournament

|-
! colspan="9" style=| NIT

Rankings

References

Monmouth Hawks men's basketball seasons
Monmouth
Monmouth